The following are the Pulitzer Prizes for 1965.

Journalism awards

Public Service:
The Hutchinson News, for its courageous and constructive campaign, culminating in 1964, to bring about more equitable reapportionment of the Kansas Legislature, despite powerful opposition in its own community.
Local General or Spot News Reporting:
 Melvin H. Ruder of the Hungry Horse News, a weekly in Columbia Falls, Montana, for his daring and resourceful coverage of a disastrous flood that threatened his community, an individual effort in the finest tradition of spot news reporting.
Local Investigative Specialized Reporting:
 Gene Goltz of the Houston Post, for his expose of government corruption in Pasadena, Texas, which resulted in widespread reforms.
National Reporting:
 Louis M. Kohlmeier of The Wall Street Journal, for his enterprise in reporting the growth of the fortune of President Lyndon B. Johnson and his family.
International Reporting:
 J. A. Livingston of the Philadelphia Bulletin, for his reports on the growth of economic independence among Russia's Eastern European satellites and his analysis of their desire for a resumption of trade with the West.
Editorial Writing:
 John R. Harrison of The Gainesville Sun, for his successful editorial campaign for better housing in his city.
Editorial Cartooning:
 No award given.
Photography:
Horst Faas of the Associated Press, for his combat photography of the war in South Vietnam during 1964.

Letters, Drama and Music Awards

Fiction:
 The Keepers of the House by Shirley Ann Grau (Random).
Drama:
 The Subject Was Roses by Frank D. Gilroy (Samuel French).
History:
 The Greenback Era by Irwin Unger (Princeton Univ. Press).
Biography or Autobiography:
 Henry Adams, three volumes by Ernest Samuels (Harvard Univ. Press).
Poetry:
 77 Dream Songs by John Berryman (Farrar).
General Non-Fiction:
 O Strange New World by Howard Mumford Jones (Viking).
Music:
 No award given.

References

External links
 

Pulitzer Prizes by year
Pulitzer Prize
Pulitzer Prize
Pulitzer Prize